Basmati, is a variety of long, slender-grained aromatic rice which is traditionally grown in India, Pakistan, and Nepal. , India accounted for 65% of the international trade in basmati rice, while Pakistan accounted for the remaining 35%. Many countries use domestically grown basmati rice crops; however, basmati is geographically exclusive to certain districts of India and Pakistan.

History and etymology

Etymology

History
Basmati rice is believed to have been cultivated in the Indian subcontinent for centuries. Earliest mention of Basmati rice has been made in the epic Heer Ranjha composed by the Punjabi poet Varis Shah in 1766.

Production and cultivation 
India accounts for over 70% of the world's basmati rice production. A small portion of that is being grown organically. Organisations such as Kheti Virasat Mission are trying to increase the amount of organic basmati rice that is being grown in the Punjab in India.

In India
The areas which have a geographical indication for basmati rice production in India are in the states of Punjab, Haryana, Himachal Pradesh, Delhi, Uttarakhand, Western Uttar Pradesh and Jammu and Kashmir. India's total basmati production for the July 2011 – June 2012 crop year was five million tonnes. From April 2018 to March 2019, India exported 4.4 million metric tons of basmati rice. In 2015–2016, Saudi Arabia, Iran and UAE were the three biggest destinations for India's basmati rice exports and exports to these three countries accounted for more than half of India's total basmati exports. In 2015–2016, basmati rice worth US$3.4 billion was exported from India.

In Pakistan 

According to the FAO, Pakistan's original Basmatic area lies in the Kalar bowl between the Ravi and Chenab rivers. In fiscal year 2020, basmati exports stood at 890,207 tonnes valuing $790 million. In overall basmati exports, Europe holds a 40% share while the rest are exported to Gulf countries, Australia and US.

In Indonesia 
Indonesia produced its own local variant of basmati in West Java and Central Kalimantan, with production capacity estimated to reach up to 8.2 tonnes per hectare. Basmati seeds were first brought from Pakistan in 2007; however, the seeds were unable to be grown due to soil incompatibility. The Ministry of Agriculture then managed to produce and cultivate a hybrid between basmati and local rice in 2017.

In Nepal
Basmati rice is produced mainly in the Terai region of Nepal and some parts of Kathmandu valley. Unique Nepali varieties of basmati rice were barred from export to other parts of the world although this ban might be lifted.

In Sri Lanka
Small amounts of basmati rice, especially red basmati rice, are being cultivated in the tropical wet zone areas of Sri Lanka.

Aroma and flavour 
Basmati rice has a typical pandan-like (Pandanus amaryllifolius leaf) flavour caused by the aroma compound 2-acetyl-1-pyrroline. Basmati grains contain about 0.09 ppm of this aromatic chemical compound naturally, a level that is about 12 times as much as non-basmati rice varieties, giving basmati its distinctive fragrance and flavour. This natural aroma is also found in cheese, fruit and other cereals. It is a flavoring agent approved in the United States and Europe, and is used in bakery products for aroma.

During cooking, the level of 2-acetyl-1-pyrroline decreases. Soaking the rice for 30 minutes before cooking permits 20% shorter cooking times and preserves more of the 2-acetyl-1-pyrroline.

Glycemic index 
According to the Canadian Diabetes Association, basmati, brown, wild, short and long grain rice has a medium glycemic index (between 56 and 69), opposed to jasmine and instant white rice with a glycemic index of 89, thus making it more suitable for diabetics as compared to certain other grains and products made from white flour.

Varieties and hybrids 

There are several varieties of basmati rice. Traditional Indian types include basmati 370, basmati 385, and basmati Ranbirsinghpura (R.S.Pura) and Gujjar Chack area in Jammu province situated at the India-Pakistani border in Jammu and Kashmir state of India. 1121 and Muradabadi 6465 Extra Long Grain Rice. Pakistani varieties of basmati rice are PK 385, Super Kernel Basmati Rice and D-98.

Scientists at Indian Agricultural Research Institute (IARI), Delhi, used conventional plant breeding to produce a hybrid semi-dwarf plant which had most of the good features of traditional basmati (grain elongation, fragrance, alkali content). This hybrid was called Pusa Basmati-1 (PB1; also called "Todal", because the flower has awns); crop yield is up to twice as high as traditional varieties. Fragrant rices that are derived from basmati stock but are not true basmati varieties include PB2 (also called sugandh-2), PB3, and RS-10.

Approved varieties

Indian varieties 
Basmati, P3 Punjab, type III Uttar Pradesh, hbc-19 Safidon, 386 Haryana, Kasturi (Baran, Rajasthan), Muradabadi Basmati 6465, Basmati 198, Basmati 217, Basmati 370 Bihar, Kasturi, Mahi Suganda, Pusa 1121, Pusa 1718, Pusa 1509, Pusa 1692, Pusa 1637, Pusa 1401.

Pakistani varieties 
Basmati 370 (Pak Basmati), Super Basmati (Best Aroma),  Basmati Pak (Kernal), 386 or 1121 basmati rice, Basmati 385, Basmati 515, Basmati 2000, Basmati 198 and Chanab Basmati.

Related varieties from around the world 
In Indonesia, the variant of basmati called baroma (aromatic basmati) was launched in February 2019. This variant could be grown in low-altitude terrain and managed to attract interest among potential middle-to-upper class consumers.

In the United States, a variety of rice based on basmati called Texmati is grown in Texas. The rice is produced by RiceSelect, previously owned by RiceTec (mentioned below).

In Kenya, a rice variety called Pishori or Pisori is grown in the Mwea region. The word Pishori is an alteration of the word Peshawari from where the basmati variety used to be exported to the countries of East Africa in the past.

Basmati certification 
The Basmati Mark is a DNA-fingerprinting-based certification done by the laboratory of Basmati Export Development Foundation (BEDF).

On 15 February 2016, the Agricultural & Processed Food Products Export Development Authority (APEDA), an autonomous organisation under the Department of Commerce in India, registered Basmati Rice as a product with Geographical Indication (GI).

Adulteration 
Difficulty in differentiating genuine basmati from other types of rice and the significant price difference between them has led fraudulent traders to adulterate basmati rice with crossbred basmati varieties and long-grain non-basmati varieties. In Britain, the Food Standards Agency found in 2005 that about half of all basmati rice sold was adulterated with other strains of long-grain rice, prompting rice importers to agree to a code of practice. A 2010 UK test on rice supplied by wholesalers found 4 out of 15 samples had cheaper rice mixed with basmati, and one had no basmati at all.

A PCR-based assay similar to DNA fingerprinting in humans allows adulterated and non-basmati strains to be detected, with a detection limit from 1% adulteration upwards with an error rate of ±1.5%. Exporters of basmati rice use purity certificates based on DNA tests for their basmati rice consignments. Based on this protocol, which was developed at the Centre for DNA Fingerprinting and Diagnostics, the Indian company Labindia has released kits to detect basmati adulteration.

Patent battle 
In September 1997, an American company, RiceTec, was granted U.S. Patent No. 5,663,484 on "basmati rice lines and grains". The patent secures lines of basmati and basmati-like rice and ways of analyzing that rice. RiceTec, owned by Prince Hans-Adam of Liechtenstein, faced international outrage over allegations of biopiracy. It had also caused a brief diplomatic crisis between India and the United States, with India threatening to take the matter to the WTO as a violation of TRIPS, the Agreement on Trade-Related Aspects of Intellectual Property Rights. Both voluntarily and due to review decisions by the United States Patent and Trademark Office, RiceTec lost or withdrew most of the claims of the patent, including, most importantly, the right to call their rice products basmati. A more limited varietal patent was granted to RiceTec in 2001 on claims dealing with three strains of the rice developed by the company.

See also 
 Ambemohar
 Camargue red rice
 Domsiah
 Jasmine rice
 List of rice varieties
 Manoomin
 Oryza sativa

References

External links 

 About patent dispute
 China: India's new basmati export destination
 Basmati Rice Suppliers in USA

Bengali cuisine
Rice varieties
Rice production in India
Rice production in Pakistan

de:Reis#Basmati-Reis